The United States Virgin Islands competed at the 1984 Summer Olympics in Los Angeles, United States.  The nation returned to the Summer Games after participating in the American-led boycott of the 1980 Summer Olympics. 29 competitors, 26 men and 3 women, took part in 31 events in 7 sports.

Athletics

Men's Marathon
 Marlon Williams — 2:46:50 (→ 75th place)

Men's Pole Vault
 John Morrisette
 Qualifying Round — 5.20m (→ did not advance)

Boxing

Equestrianism

Fencing

Four fencers, three men and one woman, represented the Virgin Islands in 1984.

Men's foil
 Julito Francis
 James Kreglo

Men's épée
 James Kerr

Men's sabre
 James Kreglo

Women's foil
 Alayna Snell

Sailing

Men

Open

Shooting

Swimming

Men's 100m Freestyle
 Erik Rosskopf
 Heat — 54.80 (→ did not advance, 47th place)

 Collier Woolard
 Heat — 55.67 (→ did not advance, 53rd place)

Men's 200m Freestyle
 Scott Newkirk
 Heat — 1:57.74 (→ did not advance, 41st place)

 Erik Rosskopf
 Heat — 2:02.04 (→ did not advance, 45th place)

Men's 400m Freestyle
 Scott Newkirk
 Heat — 4:13.11 (→ did not advance, 33rd place)

Men's 1500m Freestyle
 Scott Newkirk
 Heat — 16:50.55 (→ did not advance, 26th place)

Men's 100m Backstroke
 Erik Rosskopf
 Heat — 1:03.82 (→ did not advance, 37th place)

 Collier Woolard
 Heat — 1:06.86 (→ did not advance, 41st place)

Men's 100m Breaststroke
 Harrell Woolard
 Heat — 1:11.17 (→ did not advance, 45th place)

 Brian Farlow
 Heat — 1:11.27 (→ did not advance, 46th place)

Men's 200m Breaststroke
 Brian Farlow
 Heat — 2:37.87 (→ did not advance, 43rd place)

 Harrell Woolard
 Heat — 2:45.68 (→ did not advance, 44th place)

Men's 200m Individual Medley
 Brian Farlow
 Heat — 2:20.53 (→ did not advance, 35th place)

 Harrell Woolard
 Heat — 2:27.51 (→ did not advance, 40th place)

Men's 400m Individual Medley
 Scott Newkirk
 Heat — 4:48.15 (→ did not advance, 17th place)

Men's 4 × 100 m Freestyle Relay
 Erik Rosskopf, Brian Farlow, Collier Woolard, and Scott Newkirk
 Heat — 3:43.49 (→ did not advance, 20th place)

Men's 4 × 100 m Medley Relay
 Erik Rosskopf, Harrell Woolard, Scott Newkirk, and Collier Woolard
 Heat — 4:16.18 (→ did not advance, 18th place)

Women's 100m Freestyle
 Shelley Cramer
 Heat — 1:00.65 (→ did not advance, 29th place)

Women's 200m Butterfly
 Shelley Cramer
 Heat — 2:22.39 (→ did not advance, 24th place)

 Jodie Lawaetz
 Heat — 2:25.58 (→ did not advance, 29th place)

References

External links
 Official Olympic Reports
 

Nations at the 1984 Summer Olympics
1984
1984 in the United States Virgin Islands